= Racume, Virginia =

Unincorporated community in Virginia, United States

Coordinates: 36°44′54″N 77°43′19″W

Racume is an unincorporated community located in Brunswick County, in the U.S. state of Virginia.
